The 2015–16 Texas Tech Lady Raiders basketball team will represent Texas Tech University in the 2015–16 college basketball season. It will be head coach Candi Whitaker's third season at Texas Tech. The Lady Raiders, were members of the Big 12 Conference and will play their home games at the United Supermarkets Arena. They finished the season 13–18, 3–15 in Big 12 play to finish in ninth place. They advanced to the quarterfinals of the Big 12 women's tournament where they lost to Baylor.

Rankings
2015–16 NCAA Division I women's basketball rankings

2015–16 media

Television & Radio information
Select Lady Raiders games will be shown on FSN affiliates throughout the season, including FSSW, FSSW+, and FCS Atlantic, Central, and Pacific. All games will be broadcast on the Lady Raiders Radio Network on either KLZK or KJTV.

Roster

Schedule

|-
!colspan=12 style="background:#CC0000; color:black;"| Exhibition

|-
!colspan=12 style="background:#CC0000; color:black;"| Non-conference regular season

|-
!colspan=12 style="background:#CC0000; color:black;"| Big 12 regular season

|-
!colspan=12 style="background:#CC0000; color:black;"|  Big 12 women's basketball tournament

See also
Texas Tech Lady Raiders basketball
2015–16 Texas Tech Red Raiders basketball team

References

Texas Tech Lady Raiders basketball seasons
Texas Tech